Reflections: Greatest Hits is the first compilation album by American country music artist Lorrie Morgan. It was released on Morgan's birthday in 1995 as a special, limited production; deluxe edition. It featured three previously unreleased tracks, an enclosed biography of Lorrie Morgan, ornate packaging and the allure of collectability.

Reflections: Greatest Hits debuted on Billboard's "Hot Country Albums" chart, July 15, 1995. Morgan won the "Hot Shot Debut" award for an impressive #5 debut on the country albums chart. It debuted on the "Billboard 200" at No. 54 that same week.

Measured success
All three previously unreleased songs on the Reflections: Greatest Hits compilation were released as a single. The first, "I Didn't Know My Own Strength" was released in advance of the album and had been on the "Hot Country Singles & Tracks" chart for 11 weeks when the album debuted. The second single, "Back in Your Arms Again", was released on August 28, 1995. They peaked at numbers 1 and 4 on the Billboard "Hot Country Singles & Tracks" chart respectively. "Standing Tall", a cover of Billie Jo Spears' 1980 single, was released in September 1995 and peaked at 32 in early 1996.

The rest of the album consists of two hits from Leave the Light On, three from Something in Red, two from Watch Me, and the #13 duet with Morgan's then husband Keith Whitley, "'Til a Tear Becomes a Rose", which originally appeared on Whitley's own Greatest Hits album in 1990. Reflections peaked at #5 on the "Top Country Albums" chart and #46 on the U.S. "Billboard 200" album chart.

Track listing

Personnel on new tracks
Adapted from liner notes.

'"Back in Your Arms Again"
Larry Byrom – acoustic guitar
Paul Franklin – steel guitar
John Hobbs – piano
Dann Huff – electric guitar
Jana King – background vocals
Paul Leim – drums
Lorrie Morgan – lead vocals
Leland Sklar – bass guitar
Glenn Worf – bass guitar
Curtis Wright – background vocals
Curtis Young – background vocals 

"I Didn't Know My Own Strength" and "Standing Tall"
Larry Byrom – acoustic guitar
Glen Duncan – fiddle
Stuart Duncan – fiddle
Paul Franklin – steel guitar
John Hobbs – piano
Dann Huff – electric guitar
Jana King – background vocals
Paul Leim – drums
Lorrie Morgan – lead vocals
Leland Sklar – bass guitar
Curtis Wright – background vocals
Curtis Young – background vocals

Charts

Weekly charts

Year-end charts

Certifications

References

1995 greatest hits albums
Lorrie Morgan albums
BNA Records compilation albums